The mayors of Puerto Rico encompass the different mayors of the municipalities of Puerto Rico; each mayor being the highest-ranking officer of their corresponding municipality. Several laws existed that created the post of mayor in each municipality but they were all repealed in favor of a broad and encompassing law known as the Autonomous Municipalities Act of 1991.

The mayors do not constitute a body, and are not required by law to do so, but they have voluntarily assembled into two organizations:

 the Puerto Rico Mayors Association, which represents the mayors from the Popular Democratic Party and
 the Puerto Rico Mayors Federation, which represents the mayors from the New Progressive Party. The President of the Puerto Rico Mayors Federation in 2021 was Gabriel Hernández-Rodríguez.

Each mayor is also the commander-in-chief of its corresponding municipal police.

Background
Historically mayors used to be minor political figures in the Puerto Rican landscape as the executive branch of the government of Puerto Rico exerted an overarching authority over the municipalities. However, in recent years, the executive branch has adopted a decentralized form of government and started to focus on statewide politics rather than on local or regional ones. These policies have granted a high degree of autonomy to its municipalities and their mayors, and has allowed certain highly populated municipalities with robust local economies —such as Caguas and San Juan— to prosper and exercise a high degree of autonomy, while leaving others with mild or little population —such as Florida and Moca— with challenges to overcome. Nevertheless, these policies have made mayors highly influential on the local, regional, and statewide economy of Puerto Rico, as well as in its politics and society. An example of this would be the Willie Tax which was implemented independently in Caguas by its former mayor, William Miranda Marín. The tax was subsequently adopted by other municipalities and eventually evolved into the statewide sales tax known as the Puerto Rico Sales and Use Tax (IVU).

Today, mayors have become strong political stewardesses and anchors for other politicians seeking support from the citizens living in their municipalities. It has also become increasingly common to involve and discuss political matters with the mayors, their assemblies, and the organizations to which they belong to, before implementing public policies, and approving or vetoing bills. Both the mayors and the central government of Puerto Rico, including the Governor and the Legislative Assembly, have been able to work in unison and symbiotically to up bring Puerto Rico and its municipalities.

The Puerto Rico Mayors Association was founded in 1949 by Felisa Rincón de Gautier.  The Puerto Rico Mayors Federationwas founded in 1968 by Carlos Romero Barceló as the Federation of Municipalities of Puerto Rico. The president of the Federation as of 2017 is Carlos Molina Rodríguez, after succeeding Hector O'Neill.

Duties and powers
Mayors in Puerto Rico have the following duties:
 Organize, direct, and supervise all the administrative activities of the municipality
 Prepare the general budget of the municipality
 Administer the budget and handle credit transfers
 Hire professional, technical, and consulting services deemed necessary, convenient, or useful
 Supervise, administer, and authorize fund disbursements received by the municipality.

Requirements
The law states the following requirements to be a mayor in Puerto Rico. The candidate must:
Be at least 21 years old.
Know how to read and write.
Be a citizen of the United States and Puerto Rico.
Lived in the corresponding municipality for no less than a year before the election, and be a certified voter in it.
Not be convicted of a felony or misdemeanor which involves moral deprivation.
Not be destitute of employment for improper conduct.
Not be declared mentally unfit by a court of law.

Removal from office
According to an amend signed in 2006, a mayor in Puerto Rico can be removed from office for the following reasons:
 Being convicted of a felony.
 Being convicted of a misdemeanor which involves moral deprivation.
 Incurring in immoral conduct.
 Incurring in illegal acts which imply abandoning detrimental to the public function, inexcusable and unjustifiable negligence or conduct hindering to the best public interests. Such conduct must have affected the interests of the population and the rights of its inhabitants, must be related to the administration of the position of mayor, and must substantial in nature.

To determine the latter, any person can present charges against a mayor in front of a committee, which will then evaluate them and submit a verdict.

Election
Like most political positions in Puerto Rico, mayors are elected every four years in a general election. Voters registered as residents of each municipality vote for their respective mayors. As of now, there is no limit in terms for mayors.

Mayors 2021–2025

There are currently 41 mayors affiliated with the Popular Democratic Party (PPD), 37 are affiliated with the New Progressive Party (PNP). The longest tenured current mayor in the Commonwealth is the mayor of Dorado, Carlos López Rivera. López has been serving as mayor since being elected in 1987. The current term ends in January 2025, following the 2024 general election.

References

Government of Puerto Rico